In functional analysis and related areas of mathematics a dual topology is a locally convex topology on a vector space that is induced by the continuous dual of the vector space, by means of the bilinear form (also called pairing) associated with the dual pair.

The different dual topologies for a given dual pair are characterized by the Mackey–Arens theorem. All locally convex topologies with their continuous dual are trivially a dual pair and the locally convex topology is a dual topology.

Several topological properties depend only on the dual pair and not on the chosen dual topology and thus it is often possible to substitute a complicated dual topology by a simpler one.

Definition

Properties
 Theorem (by Mackey): Given a dual pair, the bounded sets under any dual topology are identical.
 Under any dual topology the same sets are barrelled.

Characterization of dual topologies
The Mackey–Arens theorem, named after George Mackey and Richard Arens, characterizes all possible dual topologies on a locally convex space.

Mackey–Arens theorem
Given a dual pair  with  a locally convex space and  its continuous dual, then  is a dual topology on  if and only if it is a topology of uniform convergence on a family of absolutely convex and weakly compact subsets of

See also 

 Polar topology

References 

Topology of function spaces
Linear functionals